In medicine, hyperspermia is a condition in which a male has an abnormally large amount of semen or ejaculate volume and is generally defined when the ejaculate is above 5.5 mL. It is the opposite of hypospermia, which is defined as a semen volume of less than 1.5 mL.

Hyperspermia alone does not appear to influence sperm health. However, large volumes of ejaculate may have lower relative volumes of sperm, leading to low fertility.

In some cases, high semen volumes can be a symptom of male accessory gland infection.

See also
Spermatorrhea, a controversial condition involving excess involuntary ejaculation
Hypospermia

References

Semen